John David Anderson (born December 13, 1954) is an American country music singer and songwriter with a successful career that has lasted more than 40 years. Starting in 1977 with the release of his first single, "I've Got a Feelin' (Somebody's Been Stealin')", Anderson has charted more than 40 singles on the Billboard country music charts, including five number ones: "Wild and Blue", "Swingin'", "Black Sheep", "Straight Tequila Night", and "Money in the Bank". He has also recorded 22 studio albums on several labels. His latest album, Years, was released on April 10, 2020, on the Easy Eye Sound label and was produced by Nashville veteran producer David Ferguson and Dan Auerbach of The Black Keys.

Anderson was inducted to the Nashville Songwriters Hall of Fame on October 5, 2014.

Early career
Raised in Apopka, Florida, Anderson's first musical influences were not country artists, but rock and roll musicians such as Jimi Hendrix and The Rolling Stones. He played in a rock band until the age of 15, when he discovered the music of George Jones and Merle Haggard and turned to country music. Anderson moved to Nashville, Tennessee, in 1971, arriving unannounced at his sister's home, and took on odd jobs during the day – including one as a roofer at the Grand Ole Opry House – while playing in clubs during the evenings.

The club appearances finally paid off in 1977 when he signed his first recording contract with Warner Bros. Records. He first hit the Billboard Country chart in 1977 with the song "I’ve Got a Feelin’ (Somebody's Been Stealin')", then broke into the country Top 40 with "The Girl at the End of the Bar" the next year. Anderson's decidedly backwoods accent and distinctive vocal timbre helped land him in the forefront of the "New Traditionalist" movement with artists like Ricky Skaggs and George Strait.

A steady stream of singles through the late 1970s and early 1980s continued to build Anderson's name in the country genre. The song "I'm Just an Old Chunk of Coal (But I'm Gonna Be a Diamond Someday)" from the 1981 album John Anderson 2 netted Anderson a Grammy Award nomination for Best Male Country Vocal Performance.

"Swingin'" and mainstream success

The release of Anderson's fourth album, Wild & Blue, in 1982 led to his breakthrough to mainstream country when the single "Swingin'" hit the airwaves early the next year. Co-written with long-time writing partner, Lionel Delmore, the song broke into the country charts and reached Number One by March, while at the same time crossing over to the Billboard Hot 100, reaching a peak of Number 43. The single became the biggest selling record in the history of Warner Bros. Records. In the wake of "Swingin'", Anderson received five nominations for Country Music Association awards for the year. He was the winner of the Horizon Award, and the song was named Single of the Year; he also received nominations for Song of the Year, Male Vocalist of the Year, and Album of the Year.

Anderson's success with Wild & Blue carried on through several more albums, but none would match its chart numbers or sales. In 1986, Anderson and Warner Bros. parted ways.

Seminole Wind and later career 

After leaving Warner Bros., Anderson signed with MCA Records and released two albums under that label, followed by one with Capitol Records in 1990. Chart success was minimal throughout those years. However, that turned around in 1991 when Anderson joined BNA Records and, working with legendary country producer James Stroud, released the album Seminole Wind. Powered by the title single, which rose to Number Two, and the Number One single "Straight Tequila Night", the album proved a resurgence for Anderson's career. The album has been certified two times platinum, the highest of any of Anderson's albums, and he was nominated for three CMA Awards – Male Vocalist, Song of the Year and Album of the Year.

The success of Seminole Wind brought a fresh life to Anderson's career, and he released a number of albums that charted well, producing several more singles that pushed to the upper levels of the country charts. The 1993 album Solid Ground produced a Number One single, "Money in the Bank", which turned out to be the most recent chart-topper of Anderson's career. He recorded for BNA through 1996 before leaving the label. In 1993, Anderson was awarded the Academy of Country Music Career Achievement award.

Anderson has recorded for several labels since his departure from BNA, with moderate chart success. An album entitled Bigger Hands, a return to working with Stroud as producer, was released in June 2009.

Over his career, Anderson has collaborated with a number of different artists. He worked with Waylon Jennings on his last ever live album before Jennings's death in 2002, Never Say Die: The Final Concert, where he performed a duet with Jennings on the track Waymore's Blues. He has also worked with John Rich of Big & Rich on his 2007 album Easy Money, and co-wrote Rich's 2009 single "Shuttin' Detroit Down" He has been named an honorary member of the MuzikMafia, of which Rich is also a member.

Anderson lives in Smithville, Tennessee, his home for more than 30 years with his wife and two daughters.

Discography

References

External links

1954 births
Living people
People from Apopka, Florida
People from Smithville, Tennessee
American country guitarists
American male guitarists
American country singer-songwriters
American male singer-songwriters
Country musicians from Florida
BNA Records artists
Capitol Records artists
Columbia Records artists
Mercury Records artists
MCA Records artists
RCA Records artists
Warner Records artists
Singers from Orlando, Florida
20th-century American singers
20th-century American guitarists
21st-century American guitarists
Singer-songwriters from Tennessee
Guitarists from Florida
Guitarists from Tennessee
Country musicians from Tennessee
20th-century American male singers
21st-century American male singers
21st-century American singers
Singer-songwriters from Florida